The 1992–93 BCAFL was the eighth full season of the British Collegiate American Football League, organised by the British Students American Football Association.

Changes from last season
Division Changes
There were no changes to the Divisional setup.

Team Changes
Aberystwyth University joined the Southern Conference, as the Tarannau
University of Bath joined the Southern Conference, as the Killer Bees
Newcastle Mariners rejoined the Northern Conference after a 1-season gap
Staffordshire University joined the Southern Conference, as the Stallions
University of Sunderland joined the Northern Conference, as the Wearwolves
University of the West of England joined the Southern Conference, as the Bristol Bullets
This increased the number of teams in BCAFL to 26.

Regular season

Northern Conference

Southern Conference

Playoffs

Note – the table does not indicate who played home or away in each fixture.

References

External links
 Official BUAFL Website
 Official BAFA Website

1992–93
1993 in British sport
1992 in British sport
1993 in American football
1992 in American football